Fairview Park is a town in Clinton Township, Vermillion County, in the U.S. state of Indiana. The population was 1,386 at the 2010 census.

History
Fairview Park was platted in 1902.

Geography
Fairview Park is located in the southeastern part of the county, at the north end of the city of Clinton. Indiana State Road 63 passes through the town from northeast to southwest.

Climate
The climate in this area is characterized by hot, humid summers and generally mild to cool winters.  According to the Köppen Climate Classification system, Fairview Park has a humid subtropical climate, abbreviated "Cfa" on climate maps.

Demographics

2010 census
As of the census of 2010, there were 1,386 people, 609 households, and 406 families living in the town. The racial makeup of the town was 98.2% White, 0.1% African American, 0.1% Native American, 0.2% Asian, 0.1% Pacific Islander, 0.6% from other races, and 0.5% from two or more races. Hispanic or Latino of any race were 0.8% of the population.

There were 609 households, of which 26.4% had children under the age of 18 living with them, 54.4% were married couples living together, 9.2% had a female householder with no husband present, 3.1% had a male householder with no wife present, and 33.3% were non-families. 29.7% of all households were made up of individuals, and 11.6% had someone living alone who was 65 years of age or older. The average household size was 2.28 and the average family size was 2.78.

The median age in the town was 41.9 years. 20.9% of residents were under the age of 18; 7.7% were between the ages of 18 and 24; 23.2% were from 25 to 44; 31.2% were from 45 to 64; and 16.9% were 65 years of age or older. The gender makeup of the town was 50.7% male and 49.3% female.

2000 census
As of the census of 2000, there were 1,496 people, 634 households, and 436 families living in the town. The racial makeup of the town was 96.66% White, 0.53% African American, 0.13% Native American, 0.60% from other races, and 2.07% from two or more races. Hispanic or Latino of any race were 1.40% of the population.

There were 634 households, out of which 29.8% had children under the age of 18 living with them, 56.9% were married couples living together, 9.3% had a female householder with no husband present, and 31.1% were non-families. 26.7% of all households were made up of individuals, and 9.5% had someone living alone who was 65 years of age or older. The average household size was 2.36 and the average family size was 2.86.

In the town, the population was spread out, with 22.4% under the age of 18, 8.6% from 18 to 24, 27.4% from 25 to 44, 28.1% from 45 to 64, and 13.5% who were 65 years of age or older. The median age was 40 years. For every 100 females, there were 97.9 males. For every 100 females age 18 and over, there were 94.1 males.

The median income for a household in the town was $36,078, and the median income for a family was $43,542. Males had a median income of $39,000 versus $21,667 for females. The per capita income for the town was $21,459. About 8.2% of families and 10.1% of the population were below the poverty line, including 14.4% of those under age 18 and 8.1% of those age 65 or over.

Law enforcement and fire protection
The Fairview Park Town Marshal's Office provides law enforcement to the town and the city of Clinton per request.
Fire protection is covered by the Fairview Park Fire Department. The fire house shares a building with the town hall located at 281 S Washington Street. It houses 3 frontline apparatus and one hooker.

Notable people
Len Gilmore, pitcher in Major League Baseball

References

External links
 Town of Fairview Park, Indiana website

Towns in Indiana
Towns in Vermillion County, Indiana
Terre Haute metropolitan area